Khwaja Sadid ad-Din Huzaifa al-Marashi was a famous Sufi of the Chishti Order born in Marash in present-day Turkey during the 8th century. He was a disciple of Ibrāhīm bin Adham. He died on 14th Shawal 207 Hijri, which is 823 AD. It is said that imam Al-Shafi'i was also among his Khulafa.

References

Chishtis
Iraqi Sufi saints